Đuro Ostojić (born 17 February 1976) is a Montenegrin retired professional basketball executive and former player who is a general manager for Studentski centar. At , he played the center position.

Professional career
In his professional career, Ostojić has played with Mornar, Budućnost Podgorica, Lovćen, Partizan, Breogán, Beşiktaş Cola Turka, PAOK, Gravelines-Dunkerque and Panellinios.

National team
Ostojić represented Serbia and Montenegro at the EuroBasket 2003 and the 2004 Summer Olympics. He was also a member of the Montenegrin national team.

External links
 Đuro Ostojić at acb.com
 Đuro Ostojić at euroleague.net

1976 births
Living people
BCM Gravelines players
Beşiktaş men's basketball players
CB Breogán players
Centers (basketball)
KK Budućnost players
KK Lovćen players
KK Mornar Bar players
KK Partizan players
Liga ACB players
Montenegrin expatriate basketball people in Serbia
Montenegrin men's basketball players
Olympic basketball players of Serbia and Montenegro
P.A.O.K. BC players
Panellinios B.C. players
People from Bar, Montenegro
Basketball players at the 2004 Summer Olympics